Park Joon-Kyung  (12 February 1986) is a South Korean football forward, who played for FC Gifu in J2 League.

Career 
Park was scouted by Oita High School and attended Kyushu Sangyo University after graduation. In college, Park was the Kyūshū University Football League's Top Scorer two times.
In 2009, he joined FC Gifu. On 8 March 2009, he made his professional league debut in a match against Tochigi SC. On 11 April 2009, he scored his first goal with Mito HollyHock. He did not have chance to play in 2011 and he decided to retire in the year-end.

Honours

Individual 
2005
20th Kyūshū University Football League Division 1 Top Scorer
2006, 2007, 2008 a member of the Kyūshū University team (2007, 2008 Denso Cup MVP)
2008
32nd Kyūshū University Football Tournament MVP
23rd Kyūshū University Football League Division 1 Top Scorer, MVP

Club statistics

External links 

 FC Gifu Official Website Profile 

1986 births
Living people
Kyushu Sangyo University alumni
Association football forwards
South Korean footballers
South Korean expatriate footballers
FC Gifu players
J2 League players
Expatriate footballers in Japan
South Korean expatriate sportspeople in Japan